The Bush Tabernacle Skating Rink and Event Venue is a roller skating rink and community center located in Purcellville, Virginia. The building is listed on the National Register of Historic Places.

Built in 1903, the original structure was an amphitheater-style auditorium that hosted politicians, evangelists and performers. The town of Purcellville purchased the facility in 2007, and in 2009 it closed the building because of safety concerns. An extensive renovation was completed in 2010, and the building re-opened in October.

Activities 
The Bush Tabernacle Skating Rink is open to the general public for roller skating, a Teen Center every Friday night, and it is also available for private events. Hours of operation are posted on its website.

References

External links 

Roller skating in the United States
Community centers in the United States
Buildings and structures completed in 1903
Purcellville, Virginia
Buildings and structures in Loudoun County, Virginia
National Register of Historic Places in Loudoun County, Virginia
Event venues on the National Register of Historic Places in Virginia